The 2002–03 Bulgarian Cup was the 63rd season of the Bulgarian Cup. Levski Sofia won the competition, beating Litex Lovech 2–1 in the final at the Vasil Levski National Stadium in Sofia.

First round
In this round entered winners from the preliminary rounds together with the teams of B Group.

|-
!colspan=5 style="background-color:#D0F0C0;" |9 October 2002

|}

Second round 
In this round entered winners from the First Round together with the teams of A Group.

First legs

Second legs

Third round

First legs

Second legs

Quarter-finals

First legs

Second legs

Semi-finals

First legs

Second legs

Final

The final match of the 2002–03 edition of the Bulgarian Cup was held on 21 May 2003 at the Vasil Levski National Stadium in Sofia. Levski Sofia beat Litex Lovech 2–1.

Details

References

2002-03
2002–03 domestic association football cups
Cup